The Aurora Excalibur was an unmanned aerial vehicle (UAV) developed by Aurora Flight Sciences between 2005 and 2010 capable of vertical takeoff and landing (VTOL). The design combined ducted fans and hybrid drive. A smaller scale model with a  wingspan was successfully tested on June 24, 2009. Aurora used the experience of developing this vehicle to inform their submission to the Vertical Take-Off and Landing Experimental Aircraft (VTOL X-Plane) programme funded by the Defense Advanced Research Projects Agency (DARPA).

References

External links
 Aurora Flight Sciences Excalibur page
 Excalibur first flight video

Airborne military robots
Unmanned aerial vehicles of the United States
Aurora Flight Sciences aircraft